Charles Chadwick may refer to:

Charles Chadwick (athlete) (1874–1953), American track and field athlete who competed in the 1904 Summer Olympics
Charles Chadwick (cricketer) (1880–1942), New Zealand cricketer
Charles Chadwick (novelist) (born 1932), English novelist